A Crime to Remember is an American documentary television series that airs on Investigation Discovery and premiered on November 12, 2013. It tells the stories of notorious crimes that captivated attention of the media and the public when they occurred, such as the United Airlines Flight 629 bombing from 1955.  As of the 2018 season, the series has aired 38 episodes over five seasons. All 30 episodes from the first four seasons are currently streaming on Hulu. The complete season 4 and 5 episodes are currently available on Amazon Prime Video. All episodes of the series are available through the ID GO app and the Discovery+ streaming service.

The series was officially renewed for Season 5 as of March 29, 2017, and the season began airing February 10, 2018.

Contributors
Episodes feature interviews with surviving friends and relatives, as well as surviving investigators and journalists who covered the cases and.  Other interviews feature true crime experts and authors.

Prior to her 2016 death, author and True Crime Diary blogger Michelle McNamara, wife of Patton Oswalt, was a frequent contributor to the series, a role thereafter filled by Karen Kilgariff from podcast My Favorite Murder.  The producers honored McNamara at the start of Season 4's finale: "This season of A Crime to Remember is dedicated to our friend Michelle McNamara".

Production
Each episode is treated as a mini movie, and is filmed and edited as a motion picture is.

Awards and nominations
Seasons 1, 2 and 4 won News & Documentary Emmy Awards for Outstanding Lighting Direction & Scenic Design.

Season 3 was Emmy-nominated in the same category.

Episodes
Episode dates are from TVGuide.com.

Season 1 (2013)

Season 2 (2014)

Season 3 (2015)

Season 4 (2016–2017)

Season 5 (2018)

References

External links
 Episode guide on TVGuide.com
 Series home page on InvestigationDiscovery.com
 Series virtual reality page on CrimeFeed.com
 

2013 American television series debuts
2010s American documentary television series
Investigation Discovery original programming
English-language television shows
True crime television series
2018 American television series endings